RTL Telekids was a Dutch pay television kids channel owned by RTL Nederland. In addition, RTL Telekids was broadcasting as a youth block on television channel RTL 8 during daytime till 31 December 2020. Like the rest of the Dutch RTL network, RTL Telekids was officially a Luxembourgian channel that did not have to adhere to Dutch broadcasting laws.

On December 31, 2020, RTL Telekids was closed as a block. The channel was then confirmed to close down on January 7, 2023.

Youth block

On 19 August 2010 RTL announced that the name RTL Telekids would be used for a new youth block on RTL 8. A big difference with the former programme Telekids is that the broadcast is no longer done by a presenter from the studio.

Originally RTL Telekids would start on 4 October 2010. However, on 1 October 2010, there was a car collision on the motorway A59 where a woman and three children were killed in a car accident on their way to the Efteling, where the filming would take place for the program, De Schatkamer, which is part of RTL Telekids. Out of respect for the victims' families the launch of RTL Telekids had been postponed for two weeks until 18 October 2010.

Programming
 The Adventures of Chuck and Friends
 Chloe's Closet
 Dennis the Menace
 Fireman Sam
 Gadget & the Gadgetinis
 Hallo K3
 The Koala Brothers
 Little People
 Littlest Pet Shop: A World of Our Own
 Oggy and the Cockroaches
 Robocar Poli
 Strawberry Shortcake
 Super Wings
 Tashi
 Thomas & Friends
 Transformers: Rescue Bots Academy
 Vipo: Adventures of the Flying Dog
 The Wild Adventures of Blinky Bill
 Wissper
 YooHoo & Friends
 Nina's World

References

External links
 Official site 
 Company on digital channel, Pressroom RTL Nederland
 List of Programs

RTL Nederland
Children's television networks
Television channels in the Netherlands
Defunct television channels in the Netherlands
2012 establishments in the Netherlands
Television channels and stations established in 2012
2023 disestablishments in the Netherlands
Television channels and stations disestablished in 2023